The Kwibuka T20 Tournament is a women's Twenty20 cricket tournament played annually in Rwanda since 2014. The tournament was originally named the Kwibuka Cricket for Peace tournament, and is played in remembrance of the victims of the 1994 Genocide against the Tutsi. Initially the tournament featured exclusively East African nations, but in more recent editions has expanded to include teams from across Africa and beyond.

History
The inaugural edition was held in June 2014 at the Kicukiro Oval, now known as the Gahanga International Cricket Stadium in Kigali, and was played as a five-match bilateral contest between Rwanda and Uganda, which was won 4–1 by the Ugandans. The 2015 edition was played a double round-robin tri-nation series, which saw Kenya participate in addition to Rwanda and Uganda. The Kenyans won all four of their matches to claim the title, while the hosts failed to register a win. Kenya withdrew from the 2016 tournament, leaving Rwanda and Uganda to play a bilateral series which was won 4–0 by the visitors. Uganda also won a 40-over contest the day after the conclusion of the T20 series.

In 2017, Uganda sent two age groups teams to participate, alongside Rwanda and Kenya. The Uganda Schools Select (under-19s) team won all three of their round-robin matches. Kenya won the tournament for the second time by defeating them in the final by 7 wickets, while Uganda under-23s won the third-place play-off game against Rwanda. The Ugandan School Select side returned for the 2018 edition and were again defeated by Kenya in the final, with Rwanda third; Tanzania and Zambia had originally been announced to participate for the first time.

Starting from the 2019 edition, matches played at the Kwibuka Cup have had official Women's Twenty20 International (WT20I) status, following the International Cricket Council's decision to grant full WT20I status to matches played between all of its members from 1 July 2018. Tanzania and Mali participated for the first time, along with Rwanda and Uganda; Kenya had to withdraw due to a lack of funding. Tanzania won all six of their games to claim the title on their first appearance. Uganda finished as runners-up, ahead of Rwanda in third and Mali in fourth. The tournament received global attention due to a number of WT20I records being set, including the Mali team being bowled out for six runs by the hosts Rwanda, making it the lowest team total in a completed WT20I match. The Rwandan side chased down the target of seven runs in just four balls to win the match by ten wickets with 116 balls to spare. Later in the tournament, Uganda scored 314/2 against Mali, which was the highest team total in Women's Twenty20 internationals. It was the first time in a T20 international cricket match, male or female, that a team had scored 300 runs. The Mali team were bowled out for 10 runs in 11.1 overs in the same match and the margin of victory (304 runs) was the biggest ever in a WT20I match.

No tournament was held in 2020 due to the COVID-19 pandemic. The schedule for the 2021 tournament featured six sides, including first appearances for Botswana, Namibia and Nigeria. However, Uganda had to withdraw due to cases of COVID-19 in their camp. Kenya won their fourth Kwibuka tournament by defeating Namibia by 7 wickets in the final. Rwanda finished the tournament in third place, after beating Nigeria by eight runs in the play-off match, with Botswana finishing in fifth place. The 2022 tournament was originally expected to involve eleven teams. This was later reduced to eight, including Brazil and Germany who became the first non-African nations to participate in the Kwibuka tournament.

Tournaments summary

Performance by team
Legend
 – Champions
 – Runners-up
 – Third place
Q – Qualified

References

Cricket in Rwanda
Kwibuka Cup
Women's Twenty20 cricket international competitions